Motor Industry Software Reliability Association (MISRA) is an organization that produces guidelines for the software developed for electronic components used in the automotive industry. It is a collaboration between vehicle manufacturers, component suppliers and engineering consultancies.  In 2021, the loose consortium restructured as The MISRA Consortium Limited.

Aim
The aim of this organization is to provide important advice to the automotive industry for the creation and application of safe, reliable software within vehicles. The safety requirements of the software used in Automobiles is different from that of other areas such as healthcare, industrial automation, aerospace etc. The mission statement of MISRA is "To provide assistance to the automotive industry in the application and creation within vehicle systems of safe and reliable software".

Formation
MISRA was formed by a consortium of organizations formed in response to the UK Safety Critical Systems Research Programme. This program was supported by the Department of Trade and Industry and the Engineering and Physical Sciences Research Council. Following the completion of the original work, the MISRA Consortium continued on a self-funding basis.

MISRA Consortium
The following organizations constitute the MISRA steering committee:

Current members 2022 according to website:
 Bentley Motors
 Delphi Diesel Systems
 Ford Motor Company Ltd
 HORIBA MIRA Ltd
 Peter Jesty Consulting Ltd
 Protean Electric Ltd
 Ricardo plc
 Visteon Engineering Services Ltd
 ZF TRW

The committee mainly includes vehicle manufacturers and component suppliers.

Guidelines
MISRA guidelines are the development guidelines for vehicle based software. The guidelines are intended to achieve the following:

Ensure safety
Ensure security
Bring in robustness, reliability to the software
Human safety must take precedence when in conflict with security of property
Consider both random and systematic faults in system design
Demonstrate robustness, not just rely on the absence of failures
Application of safety considerations across the design, manufacture, operation, servicing and disposal of products

As with many standards (for example, ISO, BSI, RTCA), the MISRA guideline documents are not free to users or implementers.

Language guidelines
Currently MISRA guidelines are produced for the C and C++ programming languages only.
 MISRA C++ was launched in March 2008.
 The third edition of MISRA C (known as MISRA C:2012) was published in 2013, and revised in 2019.

See also
MISRA C
High Integrity C++
Static program analysis
Coding standards
Software quality

References

Automobile associations in the United Kingdom
Computer science institutes in the United Kingdom
Computer standards
Hinckley and Bosworth
Organisations based in Leicestershire
Science and technology in Leicestershire
Software design
Standards organisations in the United Kingdom
Technical specifications